Karthick Singa, previously credited as Vasan Karthik, is a Tamil film actor. He is the son of Tamil film actor Singamuthu.

Career 
Karthick Singa, the son of comedian Singamuthu, made his debut as an actor through Maamadurai (2007) under the stage name of Vasan Karthik. He subsequently signed up for director A. R. Kendran Muniyasamy's Ayyan (2011) opposite Divya Padmini during early 2008. Karthick portrayed a dejected hero who takes to divinity and becomes Ayyan, the village guardian. The film had a delayed release and opened to mixed reviews with a reviewer noting "Vasan Karthik shows potential and his best can be brought out by a good director". In the early 2010s, he worked on a village-based drama titled Nadodi Vamsam opposite Archana Shastry, which eventually did not have a theatrical release.

In 2023, he made a return to acting with the new stage name of Karthick Singa for the film Kodai (2023).

Personal life
Karthick married Priya in a ceremony in Chennai during August 2016.

Filmography

References

Year of birth missing (living people)
Living people
Tamil male actors
Indian male film actors